Iguanurinae is a palm tree subtribe in the tribe Areceae. It is not recognized in recent classifications.

References

External links

Areceae
Arecaceae subtribes
Historically recognized angiosperm taxa
Taxa named by Joseph Dalton Hooker
Taxa named by George Bentham